South Kirkby is a town in the City of Wakefield in West Yorkshire, England which is governed locally by South Kirkby and Moorthorpe Town Council. The town forms half of the civil parish of South Kirkby and Moorthorpe. The parish has a population of 10,979.

Town council
The town retains its own town council and is represented on the district council by Wilf Benson (Independent), Michelle Collins (Labour Party) and Steve Tulley (Labour Party).

The South Kirkby and Moorthorpe Town Council motto is 'Friendship, Unity & Progress', and the two settlements have been twinned with Sprockhövel in the Ruhr Valley of Germany since 1981. The establishment of 'Sprockhövel International Friendship Circle' led to the same named organisation in South Kirkby & Moorthorpe. Since that time the Sprockhövel IFK and the South Kirkby & Moorthorpe IFC have organised an annual exchange visit.

History
The town was first mentioned 1086 in the Domesday Book, and South Kirkby retains the site of the original Saxon settlement (Grid ref: SE434104). The foundations and part of the walls of 'All Saints Church' in South Kirkby are from the period. For many centuries, they were both simply farming villages until the start of the industrial revolution. In 1881, with the foundation of the South Kirkby Colliery coal mine, an increase in population caused the villages to be extended until at its largest the two  settlements housed almost all of the 3000 workers employed in the mine. In 1984, the miners' strike included the colliery's workforce but in vain. In 1988, South Kirkby Colliery along with many of the other coal mines in the immediate area closed and later cleared for redevelopment. These included South Kirkby-Ferrymoor Riddings Drift, Frickley Colliery (Carlton Main), Kinsley Drift (formerly Hemsworth Colliery), and Grimethorpe Colliery.

Sport
The town is home to South Kirkby Colliery football club, who have competed in the FA Cup many times in their history. Another early football club of note in the town were South Kirkby Wednesday, who were early rivals of South Kirkby Colliery and nearby Frickley Colliery.

Transport
South Kirkby is served by two railway stations with a distance of one mile (1.6 km) between them. Moorthorpe railway station is on line between Leeds and Sheffield with services being an hour on weekdays and Saturdays with a two-hourly service on Sundays. South Elmsall railway station is on the line between Doncaster and Leeds with also an hourly service on weekdays and Saturdays with Sunday being every two-hourly. Both stations are served by Northern.

Notable residents
Wayne Benn grew up in the town and played professional football for Bradford City.

See also
Listed buildings in South Kirkby and Moorthorpe

References

External links

South Kirkby and Moorthorpe Town Council
S.E.S.K.U. Boxing Academy

Geography of the City of Wakefield
Towns in West Yorkshire